David Iñigo (born 16 June 1934) is an Argentine footballer. He played in four matches for the Argentina national football team from 1957 to 1963. He was also part of Argentina's squad for the 1957 South American Championship.

References

1934 births
Living people
Argentine footballers
Argentina international footballers
Place of birth missing (living people)
Association football midfielders
San Lorenzo de Almagro footballers
Chacarita Juniors footballers